Ahmed Soukouna (born 13 January 1990) is a French professional footballer who plays as a striker for Régional 1 club Béziers B.

Career
Soukouna began playing football at the age of 7 with Montpellier HSC, and moved to Toulouse FC in 2005. He made his professional debut on 29 October 2008, for Toulouse in a Ligue 1 game against Paris Saint-Germain.

On 3 August 2010, he was on trial with Preston North End.

Soukouna joined Béziers in 2012, competing in Championnat de France Amateur.

Personal life
Born in France, Soukouna is of Malian descent.

References

External links
 

1990 births
Living people
AS Béziers (2007) players
Association football forwards
Castelnau Le Crès FC players
Championnat National 2 players
Championnat National 3 players
Championnat National players
Footballers from Paris
French footballers
French people of Malian descent
Ligue 1 players
Ligue 2 players
Montpellier HSC players
Régional 1 players
Toulouse FC players